Richard Touko (born 22 June 1983 in Ngaoundéré) is a Cameroonian footballer who is a defender for Canon Yaounde.

Club career
Touko began his career with Canon Yaounde, and transferred to Racing FC Bafoussam, where he participated in the CAF Champions League 2005. He played for Cotonsport Garoua during the 2006 season.

References

1983 births
Living people
Cameroonian footballers
Association football defenders
Coton Sport FC de Garoua players